The Exclusives (formerly Move Sumthin Productions) are an American/Canadian R&B/pop/hip hop songwriting and production team from Miami, Florida, consisting of Sean "Pen" McMillion and Ralph "Vintage" Jeanty. The now Atlanta-Based team's first notable success came from co-writing the platinum-selling single "I Luv This Shit" by August Alsina.

Music career
The Exclusives began as songwriters and producers, co-writing the song "Never Window Shopping" for Lloyd on his Zone 4/Interscope release King of Hearts.

Under the mentorship of R&B legend Betty Wright, the duo collaborated with Wright and The Roots, co-writing two songs on their album Betty Wright: The Movie, released on November 15, 2011. The album received mostly positive reviews; Metascore gave it a 73 out of 100. Pen and Vintage co-wrote the songs "Real Woman", featuring Snoop Dogg, and "Baby Come Back", featuring Lenny Williams.

Work on the Betty Wright album afforded them the opportunity to work with The Roots on their first concept album, entitled Undun, which was released on December 2, 2011. The album debuted at No. 17 on Billboard Hot 200; The Exclusives co-wrote the song "The Other Side", featuring Greg Porn and Bilal.

The duo met a young August Alsina in 2011 and recorded "I Luv This Shit" in 2012. It topped the Mainstream R&B/Hip-Hop chart for two weeks in November 2013, August Alsina became the first R&B artist to reach number one with a debut single since Jeremih with "Birthday Sex" in 2009. On the main Hot R&B/Hip-Hop Songs, it reached number 15, and peaked at number 19 on the Rhythmic chart. It peaked at number 48 on the Billboard Hot 100. On March 6, 2014, the Recording Industry Association of America (RIAA) certified "I Luv This Shit" gold for shipping 500,000 copies. The certification was updated to platinum on October 2, 2014.
 
In August 2014, The Exclusives inked a publishing deal with Warner Chappell Music.

Notable charted songs

Executive production credits

 August Alsina – This Thing Called Life

Discography

Writing/production credits for The Exclusives on notable works 
 2013: "I Luv This Shit" – August Alsina ft. Trinidad James
 2013: "I Luv This Shit" Remix – August Alsina ft. Trey Songz and Chris Brown
 2015: "Gold Slugs"  – DJ Khaled featuring Chris Brown, August Alsina and Fetty Wap
 2016: "Do You Mind" – DJ Khaled featuring Nicki Minaj, Chris Brown, August Alsina, Jeremih, Future and Rick Ross

References

Living people
Canadian record producers
African-American record producers
Record producers from Florida
African-American songwriters
Songwriters from Florida
Year of birth missing (living people)
21st-century African-American people